"Love U Better" is a song written, and performed by American singer Ty Dolla $ign, featuring American rapper Lil Wayne and fellow American singer The-Dream. It was released on July 10, 2017, as the lead single from the former's second studio album, Beach House 3  (2017).

Release and composition
Ty Dolla Sign announced "Love U Better" on July 7, 2017, and shared the single's artwork on his social media accounts. The song premiered via Zane Lowe's Beats 1 radio show on July 10, and was released for digital download as a single on the same day. It was sent to urban radio July 25, 2017. "Love U Better" has been described as an electro-R&B track by Rolling Stone. It contains a sample from 1997 song "I Can Love You" by singer Mary J. Blige.

Commercial performance
"Love U Better" peaked at number 12 on the Billboard Bubbling Under Hot 100, performing modestly on radio . In New Zealand, the song reached number 49, as well as number 97 In Australia.

Music video
The music video for the song, directed by Ryan Hope, was shot in the Hollywood Hills and premiered via Ty Dolla Sign's YouTube channel on August 3, 2017. It features cameo appearances from YG, Sevyn Streeter, Jeremih and Trae tha Truth.
It also features Jhene Aiko and Big Sean with Wizkid.

Charts

Certifications

Release history

References

External links

2017 singles
2017 songs
Ty Dolla Sign songs
Atlantic Records singles
Song recordings produced by Mustard (record producer)
Songs written by Mustard (record producer)
Songs written by Ty Dolla Sign
Songs written by The-Dream
Songs written by Lil Wayne
Songs written by Lil' Kim
Songs written by Mary J. Blige
Electro songs